Abandonada is a 2000 Philippine drama film directed by Joel Lamangan. The film stars Maricel Soriano, Edu Manzano and Angelu de Leon.

The film is streaming online on YouTube.

Plot
After being jailed in Canada, Gemma (Maricel) returns to the Philippines, only to discover that her husband Edwin (Edu) abandoned her for Cindy (Angelu) and took their son Marco (King) with him. In order to get closer to her son and get the chance to confront Edwin, she applies as a nanny for Marco.

Cast
 Maricel Soriano as Gemma
 Edu Manzano as Edwin
 Angelu de Leon as Cindy
 Jay Manalo as Nando
 Ynez Veneracion as Glo
 Perla Bautista as Manang Bining
 Maureen Mauricio as Rose
 Mel Kimura as Myrna
 Tita de Villa as Remy
 Gigette Reyes as Emily
 Bernard Palanca as Julian
 Jim Pebanco as Jess
 Tony Mabesa as Atty. Mallonca
 King Alcala as Marco
 Angelo Macam as 1-year old Marco
 Aurora Uding as Landlady
 Ronald Butlig as Nestor
 Jon Romano as Didoy
 Jackie Castillejos as Guia

Awards

References

External links

Full Movie on Viva Films

2000 films
2000 drama films
Filipino-language films
Philippine drama films
Viva Films films
Films directed by Joel Lamangan